Gajah Mungkur Reservoir (Dam) is a water reservoir located at Pokohkidul in the Wonogiri Regency, Central Java, of Indonesia. It was constructed by redirecting the Bengawan Solo River, the longest in the Java Islands, which originates from The Gajah Mungkur Mountain. The maximum inundation area of Gajah Mungkur Reservoir is 8,800 hectares and covers the seven subdistricts of Wonogiri, Ngadirojo, Nguntoronadi, Baturetno, Giriwoyo, Eromoko, and Wuryantoro.

The reservoir is used for irrigation, hydroelectric power, source of drinking water, tourism, aquaculture, and fisheries. Various fish may be found in the water, including parrotfish, wader pari, tawes, and patin jambal.

History
Initial planning for the project began in 1964, with the intention of building a flood controller for the Bengawan Solo river. The final plan was formulated between 1972 and 1974 with the help of the Japan International Cooperation Agency.

Construction required the flooding of 51 villages in six districts. Construction began in late 1976 and the project was completed in 1981. The reservoir became operational in 1982.

The reservoir was supposed to last for 100 years. However, due to the severe watershed (DAS) damage causing very high reservoir sedimentation, the reservoir is not expected to last this long.

See also

 Kedung Ombo Dam

References

Dams in Indonesia
Hydroelectric power stations in Indonesia
Rock-filled dams
Reservoirs in Indonesia